Chaps ( or ) are sturdy coverings for the legs consisting of leggings and a belt. They are buckled on over trousers with the chaps' integrated belt, but unlike trousers, they have no seat (the term "assless chaps" is a tautology) and are not joined at the crotch. They are designed to provide protection for the legs and are usually made of leather or a leather-like material. Their name is a shortened version of the Spanish word chaparajos. Chaparajos were named after the chaparral (thick, thorny, low brush) from which they were designed to protect the legs while riding on horseback. Like much of western American horse culture, the origin of chaparajos was in the south of Spain, from which it then passed on to the part of New Spain that later became Mexico, and has been assimilated into cowboy culture of the American west. They are a protective garment to be used when riding a horse through brushy terrain. In the modern world, they are worn for both practical work purposes and for exhibition or show use. Chaps have also been adopted for use on motorcycles, particularly by cruiser-style motorcycle riders.

History

Chaps derive from "zahones", used in southern Spain by hunters and vaqueros to protect the trousers from scratches produced by brushing with plants or branches. They were most likely adopted in Spanish America along with the cowboy culture, and from there they passed into the American Wild West. The earliest form of protective leather garment used by mounted riders who herded cattle in Spain and Mexico were called armas, meaning "weapons". They were essentially two large pieces of cowhide that were used as a protective apron of sorts. They attached to the horn of the rider's stock saddle, and were spread across both the horse's chest and the rider's legs. From this early and rather cumbersome design came modifications that placed the garment entirely on the rider, and then style variations adapted as vaqueros, and later cowboys, moved north from Mexico into the Pacific coast and northern Rockies regions of what today are the United States and Canada. There is also evidence that certain design features may derive from the mountain men, who copied them from the leggings worn by Native Americans. Different styles developed to fit local climate, terrain and hazards. Designs were also modified for purely stylistic and decorative purposes. The time of actual appearance of the garment on American cowboys is uncertain. By the late 1870s, however, most Texas cowboys wore them as the cattle industry moved north.  By 1884, the Dictionary of American Regional English notes use of the word in Wyoming, spelled "schaps".

The word chaps is a clip of chaparajos or chaparreras, which are Mexican Spanish words for this garment, ultimately derived from Spanish chaparro, one sense of which is a low growing thicket—difficult to ride through without damage to clothing. Since at least the end of the 19th century, in the western United States and Canada, English-speaking riders have tended to pronounce the word . This pronunciation is also used among rodeo riders in New Zealand. English-speaking riders in the eastern United States and Canada, Australia, and the United Kingdom have tended to pronounce the word .

Equestrian chaps

Shotgun chaps, sometimes called "stovepipes", were so named because the legs are straight and narrow. They were the earliest design used by Texas cowboys, in wide use by the late 1870s. Each leg is cut from a single piece of leather. Their fit is snug, wrapping completely around the leg. They have full-length zippers running along the outside of the leg from the thigh to just above the ankle. The edge of each legging is usually fringed and the bottom is sometimes cut with an arch or flare that allows a smooth fit over the arch of a boot. Shotguns do not flap around the way the batwing design can, and they are also better at trapping body heat, an advantage in windy, snowy or cold conditions, though unpleasant in very hot or humid weather. Shotgun chaps are more common on ranches in the northwest, Rocky Mountains and northern plains states, as well as Canada, and are the design most commonly seen in horse show competition for western riders, especially western equitation. English riders who wear full-length chaps also usually wear a shotgun style, sometimes without fringe.

Batwing chaps are cut wide with a flare at the bottom. Generally made of smooth leather, they have only two or three fasteners around the thigh, thus allowing great freedom of movement for the lower leg. This is helpful when riding very actively, and makes it easier to mount the horse. This design also provides more air circulation and is thus somewhat cooler for hot-weather wear. Batwing chaps are often seen on rodeo contestants, particularly those who ride bucking stock. They are also seen on working ranches, particularly in Texas.  They were a later design, developed after the end of the open range. Although by definition the chaps that rodeo contestants wear are considered batwing chaps, contestants do not refer to them as batwings. They are simply called rodeo chaps. There are a few differences in design between working ranch batwing chaps and rodeo chaps. Rodeo chaps are usually more colorful and decorated, whereas ranch cowboys need toughness over style. Rodeo chaps have long flowing fringe which can be the same or a different color as the main body.

Chinks are half-length chaps that stop two to four inches (5 to 10 cm) below the knee, with very long fringe at the bottom and along the sides. They are usually fringed along the outside edge and bottom, making their apparent length appear about 4 inches (10 cm) longer. The leg shape is cut somewhere between batwings and shotguns, and each leg usually has only two fasteners, high on the thigh. They are cooler to wear and hence a design that is suitable for very warm climates. They are occasionally called "half-chaps" (not to be confused with gaiters-style half chaps described below). The original etymon may have been  chincaderos or chigaderos. and may have originally referred to armitas. Chinks are most often seen on cowboys in the Southwestern and Pacific states, most notably on those who follow the California vaquero or "buckaroo" tradition.

Armitas are an early style of chaps, developed by the Spanish in colonial Mexico and became associated with the "buckaroos" or vaqueros of the Great Basin area of what is now the United States. They are a short legging with completely closed legs that have to be put on in a manner similar to pants. They are sometimes a bit longer than chinks, but still stopping above the top of the boot, fringed on the sides and on the bottom to reach the boot tops, attached by a fringed belt.

A farrier's apron is a specialized style of chinks without fringe, also known as horse shoeing chaps. They protect the upper legs of farriers from getting scratched or cut up in the process of shoeing or otherwise treating the hooves of horses. Some designs have a breakaway front for safety while working. Farrier's aprons are also sometimes used by ranch hands when stacking hay to reduce wear on clothing.

Woolies are a variation on shotgun chaps, made with a fleece or with hair-on cowhide, often angora, lined with canvas on the inside. They are the warmest chaps, associated with the northern plains and Rocky Mountains. They appeared on the Great Plains somewhere around 1887.

Zamorros somewhat resemble batwing chaps, in that the leggings are closely fitted at the thigh and flare out below the knee, but unlike batwings, the leggings extend far below the boot with a distinctive triangular flare.  Zamorros are commonly made of cowhide, either plain tanned leather or hides with the hair on. They are popular with Paso Fino aficionados, and are derived from styles seen in Colombia. Historically, the word zamorros simply referred to a basic shotgun-like style of either smooth or hair-on chaps worn by Colombian riders.

European variations

Chaps worn by campinos in Portugal during the 1950s were sheepskin or goatskin with the wool or hair on and of a "drainpipe" style, while in Spain, chaps were without hair and feature intricately worked designs called "poker-work."  In Spain today, rejoneadores wear smooth chaps attached with a single strap behind the knee. They are also worn in monterías, either in their leather or Grazalema variations.

Uses
Chaps are intended to protect the legs of cowboys from contact with daily environmental hazards seen in working with cattle, horses and other livestock. They help to protect riders' legs from scraping on brush, injury from thorns of cacti, sagebrush, mesquite and other thorny vegetation.
Chaps are also useful for other types of riding. Leather chaps stick to a leather saddle or a bareback horse better than do fabric trousers and thus help the rider stay on. They are worn by rodeo competitors in "rough stock" events, including bull riding, saddle bronc and bareback riding. Riders in other disciplines, including various styles of English riding, sometimes wear chaps while schooling horses.

Chaps are commonly worn by western riders at horse shows, where contestants are required to adhere to traditional forms of clothing, albeit with more decorative touches than seen in working designs. Currently chaps are also worn as a fashion choice for equestrian training and clinics. Chaps may now include contrast seams, elastic for better fit and crystal detailing. Chaps are often required by show rules, and even when optional under the rules are often worn to give a "finished" look to an outfit. Fashions change periodically and styles vary between the assorted sub-disciplines within western-style riding.

Non-equestrian chaps

Chainsaw chaps are a component of chainsaw safety clothing. They are made of strong materials like kevlar and protect the legs from injury. A similar style, though of different materials, is sold to hunters and other outdoor sportsmen for protection from rattlesnake bites. Outside of snake country, bird hunters often wear "upland chaps" made of waxed cotton or nylon to protect their legs from briars and thorns. Use of upland chaps allows any type of pants to be worn in the field and they are also used to protect rain suits.

Motorcycle chaps are a type of motorcycle safety clothing and are an example of the shotgun style. They are usually made of leather with the smooth side out, and generally provide all-around protection for the leg and have side zippers to allow them to be put on easily. They are popular in the biker subculture, providing protection from the wind and cold as well as partial protection from cuts and scrapes in the event of a fall to the roadway.

Chaps are also popular in fetish fashion and the leather subculture, where they often are tightly fitted and worn without jeans or other garments layered beneath them other than a codpiece. They can be made of leather, patent leather, rubber, or vinyl and are worn for decoration serving no protective purpose. Worn in this manner, they are colloquially referred to as "assless" chaps, despite the redundancy of the term (all chaps are "assless"; chaps with a seat would be called trousers). More often, this style of chaps are referred to as "bar" chaps.

Materials and construction

Equestrian chaps, with the exception of woolies, are traditionally made of cowhide.  Woolies, some Zamorros, and a few other historic or ethnic styles may be made with the hair or wool still on the hide, usually cowhide, sheepskin, or Angora goat skin. Historically, they also included seal, bear, and buffalo.

Leather for chaps is tanned and dyed, and the hide is usually "split" so that the leather is supple and can be made into a garment that allows easy movement. There is a rough side, what is today called suede or "roughout", and a smooth side. Chaps are made in both "roughout" and "smooth out" (smooth side out) designs. Most batwings and chinks are made smooth side out, most shotguns are suede, or roughout. For horse shows, where fashions may change from year to year and durability is not as great a concern, lighter, synthetic materials such as ultrasuede and vinyl may be used, though leather suede or a smooth split predominates due to durability and proper fit.  In Australia, chaps may be made of oilskin rather than leather.

Most chaps, with the exception of Armitas (which have no metal parts), usually have a small metal buckle in front to attach around the waist, and have lacing on the back of the belt area to allow adjustment in size. A few designs lace in the front and buckle in the back, but they are not often seen. The sides of some designs, particularly the batwing style, either have straps and relatively small metal buckles or snaps to attach the legging around the rider's leg. Other styles, particularly shotguns, usually use full-length heavy-duty metal zippers. Some historic styles of riding chaps used a single break-away leather string or lace instead of a front buckle. The original purpose was to break away if a rider's chaps' belt somehow became hooked over the saddle horn.

Except for the batwing design, most chaps are fringed along the edge of the leg, usually a fringe of the same leather as the legging, though occasionally a contrasting color of leather may be added. Chinks and Armitas have fringe on the bottom of the leg as well. The belt that holds on a pair of the chaps may be the same color of leather or of a contrasting color, sometimes is fringed in the back for show, but usually not on a working outfit. Decorative leather designs or fancy stitching may be added along the edge of bottom of the leg or to the belt, and even sterling silver pieces may be used for buckles, and on round decorative metal conchos placed to cover the lacing on the back of the belt, or occasionally even at the bottom of the legging, by the heel.

Half chaps

Half chaps, also known as chapettes, are a popular style of equestrian gaiters that extend from the ankle to just below the knee. When worn over a short paddock boot they give the protection and some of the appearance of a tall riding boot, but at lower cost. They are widely worn by children in horse shows and by trail riders. Half chaps usually are made of leather, and have a zipper or hook and loop closure on the outside. They provide grip for the rider, and protection from sweat and the stirrup leather. They are commonly used over the paddock boots of English-style riders in place of tall boots. While not true chaps, some Western-style riders use half chaps, particularly in hot weather, but gaiter-style half chaps are not traditional cowboy gear.

Fitting
Chaps are usually worn over denim jeans or other trousers of heavy material. They have their own belt, and usually are fitted around the hips, resting below the belt loops of the trousers. Except for chinks and armitas, which are designed to fit above the boot, most chaps are long, fitting over the boot and draping slightly over the vamp of the boot (see shoe). Some designs are cut to hang long at the heel and nearly cover the entire boot except for the toe. Batwings, chinks, and shotgun chaps fit firmly but comfortably around the thigh, with shotguns continuing to fit closely all the way down the calf, though not so snug as to limit free knee movement. The shotgun design is a bit flared at the ankle to allow for the rider's boot. Batwings and chinks are not attached around the leg below the knee.

See also
 Buckskins
 Personal protective equipment
 Shin guard

References

Further reading

"Cowboy Armor."  Western Horseman, July 2007, pp 145–146
 Etymology On Line
 Tom Lindmier and Steve Mount. I See By Your Outfit: Historic Cowboy Gear of the Northern Plains
Price, Steven D., ed. The Whole Horse Catalogue. New York: Simon and Schuster/Brigadore Press, 1977, p. 168
 "Buckaroos in Paradise - Glossary" American Memory from The Library of Congress. Web site accessed September 2, 2007
 "Cowboy Chinks and Chaps-Pronouncing chinks and chaps." Web site accessed September 2, 2007
 "February 2007 Westerners: Wild and Wooly Chaps." The History Net. Web site accessed September 2, 2007
 "Rodeo terminology." Web site accessed September 2, 2007
 "A Cowboy's Personal Gear", web site accessed September 2, 2007
 Roy Rogers and Dale Evans Museum and Happy Trails Theater, p. 17
 "Cowboy", Encyclopædia Britannica Online. Web page accessed March 27, 2008

1870s fashion
19th-century fashion
20th-century fashion
Rider apparel
Safety clothing
Trousers and shorts
Western wear
Rodeo clothing
Western (genre) staples and terminology